Johannes Peter Letzmann (19 July 1885 – 21 May 1971) was an Estonian meteorologist, and a pioneering tornado researcher.  His prolific output related to severe storms concepts included: developing tornado damage studies, atmospheric vortices, theoretical studies and laboratory simulations, tornado case studies, and observation programs.  It generated extensive analysis techniques and insights on tornadoes at a time when there was still very little research on the subject in the United States.

Biography 
From 1906 to 1913 Letzmann attended the University of Tartu in Tartu, Estonia, studying meteorology.  His career studying tornadoes began in 1918 when the esteemed visiting scientist Alfred Wegener introduced him to his copious European tornado climatological and other studies.  The University of Helsinki awarded Letzmann a PhD in 1924.  Most of his studies were done at Dorpat (Tartu), but he did travel with Wegener for a year in 1928 to the University of Graz.  He was a professor of meteorology at the University of Graz from 1939 (or 1940) to 1945. There he built a "Forschungsstelle für atmosphärische Wirbel" (Research Center for atmospheric whirls).  After the war he lost his chair, but he remained in Graz, Austria.  In 1962, he elected to retire to a hostel established for former Baltic Germans at Langeoog, an island off the North Sea coast of Germany. Letzmann's antebellum work remained forgotten for decades until rediscovery beginning in the 1990s

See also 
 John Park Finley

References

External links 
 Richtlinien zur Erforschung von Tromben, Tornados, Wasserhosen und Kleintromben
 
 Alfred Wegener's tornado research and his influence on Johannes Letzmann: Scientific achievements decades ahead of their time
 Center of Competence for Severe Local Storms in Germany, Austria  and Switzerland (TorDACH)
 European Severe Storms Laboratory (ESSL)

Further reading 
 H. Eelsalu, H. Tooming, Eds. (1995). Meteorology in Estonia in Johannes Letzmann's times and today. . Tallinn.

1885 births
1971 deaths
People from Cēsis
People from the Governorate of Livonia
Meteorologists
20th-century Estonian scientists
University of Tartu alumni
University of Helsinki alumni
Academic staff of the University of Graz